The Diocese of Yukon is a diocese of the Ecclesiastical Province of British Columbia and Yukon of the Anglican Church of Canada. It comprises 14 congregations serving 24 communities in the Yukon and parts of northern British Columbia.

The Diocese was formed in 1891 when the Diocese of Mackenzie River, at that time in the Ecclesiastical Province of Rupert's Land, was divided into two. Originally the Diocese of Selkirk, the name of the diocese was changed to Yukon in 1907. It was transferred to its present province in 1947.

Terrence Buckle became the Diocesan bishop in 1995. He was also Metropolitan of the Province of British Columbia and Yukon from 2005–2009. In November 2007 Buckle announced his intention to retire at the end of 2008 but following an inconclusive election synod postponed his retirement plans. He eventually retired in 2010, after the election of Larry Robertson.

On May 15, 2010, Larry D. Robertson, since 1999 suffragan bishop in the western region of the Diocese of the Arctic, was elected Bishop of Yukon. He was installed at Christ Church Cathedral in Whitehorse on September 18, 2010.

On May 4, 2019, Lesley C. Wheeler-Dame was elected as Co-adjutor bishop. Lesley was consecrated and installed on August 24, 2019. She is the first female to serve as Diocesan bishop.

In January 2009, Ronald Ferris, former Bishop of Yukon (1981-1995) and subsequently Bishop of Algoma (1995-2008) resigned from the Anglican Church of Canada to continue as a bishop in the Anglican Network in Canada.

Bishops of Selkirk
William Bompas, Bishop of Selkirk, 1890–1905
Isaac Stringer, Bishop of Selkirk, 1905–1907

Bishops of Yukon
Isaac Stringer, Bishop of Yukon, 1907–1931; Bishop of Rupert's Land, 1931–1934 and Metropolitan of Rupert’s Land, 1931–1934
Arthur Sovereign (1932); afterwards Bishop of Athabasca, 1933–1950
William Geddes, 1934–1947
Walter Adams, 1947–1952; Metropolitan of British Columbia & Yukon, 1947–1952 & first titled Archbishop
Tom Greenwood (1952–1962)
Henry Marsh, 1962–1967
John Frame, 1968–1981
Ron Ferris, 1981–1995
Terry Buckle, 1995–2010; Metropolitan of British Columbia & Yukon, 2005–2009
Larry Robertson, 2010–2019
, August 2019 – present, 1st Female Bishop in Diocese

Deans of Yukon
The Dean of Yukon is also Rector of Christ Church Cathedral, Whitehorse

Source: Christ Church Cathedral
1978–1982: Kenneth Coben Snider (1st Dean)
1982–1984: Leonard Mack McFerran
1985–2001: Desmond Fredrick Carroll
2002–2008: John "Peter" Williams
2010–2019: Sean Murphy
2019–present: Harold "Bert" A. Chestnut

References

External links
 Diocesan website

 
Yukon, Anglican Diocese of
Christianity in Yukon
Anglican Province of British Columbia and Yukon